In the United States, acting white is a pejorative term, usually applied to black people, which refers to a person's perceived betrayal of their culture by assuming the social expectations of white society. It can be applied to success in education, but this view is highly debated. In 2020, 93.6% of African Americans between 25 and 39 had a high school diploma, on par with the national average.

The term is controversial, and its precise meaning is hard to define. It is theorized that some minority students are discouraged from achieving in school by the negative prejudices of ethnic peers; such a view has been expressed in articles in The New York Times, Time magazine, and The Wall Street Journal—and by public figures and academics across the political spectrum.

History of usage

The question of whether or not "acting white" attitudes are prevalent has been debated in academic literature. In 1986, Nigerian sociologist John Ogbu co-authored with Signithia Fordham a study that concluded that high-performing African-American students in a Washington, D.C. high school borrowed from hegemonic white culture as part of a strategy for achievement, while struggling to maintain a black identity, and the "acting white theory" was born.

Black comedian, media figure and subsequent convicted sex offender Bill Cosby used the term in what became a noted May 2004 speech when he challenged the black community against the idea that gaining education was "acting white." Don Lemon has also claimed that African-American communities are harmed by referring to use of proper English or finishing school as "acting white."

Black people accused of "acting white" are sometimes referred to as Black Anglo-Saxons, a term coined by comedian Paul Mooney.

Accusations of "acting white"

Barack Obama
In 2008 before Obama's election, Ralph Nader, a longtime activist, characterized the senator as "talking white." 

Obama's presidential victory in the 2008 election and public image prompted a public discussion about whether he would shift the ground of critics of 'acting white'. Commentators John McWhorter and Stephen J. Dubner have said that it might. Yahanna of the Israelite School of Universal Practical Knowledge, described by the Southern Poverty Law Center as a black supremacist sect, did not consider Obama to be black but "African of white descent" and advised African Americans not to vote for him.

Obama strongly criticized the idea that achievement was limited to "acting white" in his keynote address at the 2004 Democratic National Convention. He said that "children can't achieve unless we raise their expectations and turn off the television sets and eradicate the slander that says a black youth with a book is acting white."

Russell Wilson
Denver Broncos (then with the Seattle Seahawks) football player Russell Wilson came under fire in 2014 when anonymous sources alleged that the feeling in the locker room of his former team, the Seattle Seahawks, was that Wilson lacked "blackness." Mike Freeman, writing for Bleacher Report, speculated that this conflict was a possible reason for the trading of player Percy Harvin from the Seahawks to the New York Jets.

Case studies and research
Not all scholars define acting white in the same way. Most definitions include a reference to situations where some minority adolescents ridicule their peers for engaging in behaviors perceived to be characteristic of whites. In this scenario, they equate "white behavior" with high grades in school, a result researchers can quantify, but the term is not limited to this. 

A fundamental drawback of much of the research so far is that the people studied have been asked to rate their own popularity in the eyes of others, which naturally brings those scores into question. Roland G. Fryer, Jr. has remarked, "Asking teenagers whether they’re popular is like asking them if they’re having sex."

Fordham and Ogbu 
In 1986, Signithia Fordham co-authored with Nigerian sociologist John Ogbu a study that concluded that high-performing African-American students in a Washington, D.C. high school borrowed from hegemonic white culture as part of a strategy for achievement, while struggling to maintain a black identity. Ogbu made a related claim in his 2003 book, Black American Students in an Affluent Suburb: A Study of Academic Disengagement, concluding that black students' own cultural attitudes sometimes hindered academic achievement and that these attitudes are too often neglected. 

Ogbu had earlier written in his seminal work Minority Education and Caste (1978), that school disengagement among caste-like minorities occurs because white society limits the job-success of their parents and others in their communities by a glass ceiling. In his new book, he said that non-whites "failed to observe the link between educational achievement and access to jobs."

Expressions such as "acting white" may or may not reflect black teenagers' cultural values, and their usage is sometimes counterintuitive. Ogbu (2003) himself, for instance, documented one instance where a black teenage girl with natural hair was accused of "acting white" by her black peers because "like white people, she did not have to process her hair." These kind of examples show that accusations of "acting white" are not fundamentally about black cultural attributes (although such accusations may reflect these attributes). Rather, "acting white" is just a manifestation of racial identity development for black children and teenagers, who are learning and defining for themselves what it means to be "black"—in conjunction with normal adolescent peer pressure and hassles. That is also why such accusations are less common among black adults, who have come to greater resolution regarding racial identity issues.

Other studies 
In 1997 the scholars Philip J. Cook and Jens Ludwig published a report finding that blacks do not face any stronger social pressures than whites to succeed in school, nor do they have greater feelings of alienation towards education in general. They noted anecdotal and ethnographic research confirming that minority students hold these views, but they concluded that these are not inherently generalizable and do not substantially affect student behavior in the classroom. They labeled the issue "something of a distraction" from what they saw as more important educational reforms.

Though Ogbu's 1978 study's conclusion was widely discussed, a 2003 work also challenged its validity. In 2003, sociologist Karolyn Tyson and economist William Darity, Jr., of the University of North Carolina at Chapel Hill, conducted an 18-month study at 11 North Carolina schools. The study concluded that white and black students have essentially the same attitudes about scholastic achievement; students in both groups want to succeed in school and show higher levels of self-esteem when they do better in school. They compared attitudes identified as acting white to the normal adolescent pains experienced in John Hughes' movies.

A 2010 study by Roland G. Fryer, Jr. and Paul Torelli suggested that the phenomenon probably had little to no effect on students achieving at average levels, but might explain a significant role in the disparities between black and white students at high achievement levels. Fryer has also written that, in contrast to Fordham and Ogbu's theory, "acting white" prejudices are actually more common the more integrated the school, with historically black schools free of any effects. He found that groups such as Italian immigrants in Boston's West End and the Maori of New Zealand display similar behaviors. He concluded that there is necessarily a trade-off between doing well and rejection by your peers when you come from a traditionally low-achieving group, especially when that group comes into contact with more outsiders.

Stuart Buck, a lawyer, also explored this issue in Acting White: The Ironic Legacy of Desegregation (2010). He said that segregated black schools had featured teachers, counselors, and others of the same race as the student population, and the adults often acted as mentors to the students. Integration of many public schools since the mid- to late-20th century may have resulted in schools in which black students perceived they were controlled or dominated by whites. A black student trying to achieve high educational success may then be considered as trying to leave the minority group.

Margaret Beale Spencer and Vinay Harpalani (2008) argue that usage of the term acting white by black teenagers does not reflect their cultural values; rather, it is a manifestation of their racial identity development, experienced in conjunction with normal adolescent hassles and peer pressure. Spencer and Harpalani employ William E. Cross' (1991) 'Nigrescence' framework and contend that black teenagers' use of "acting white" in relation to academic achievement is similar to white teenagers' use of the term nerd: the only difference is that black teenagers express it in racialized terms, as in addition to normal teenage peer pressure, they are grappling with racial identity and what it means to be "black."

Other languages
In Latin American Spanish, a similar expression, hacer las cosas como los blancos ( "do things like whites") is a pseudo-positive racist statement, a rebuke commonly directed from black people to other black people who are able to do something in the "correct" manner, implying that white people always do well at everything.

Commentary
Anne Arnett Ferguson, a professor at Smith College, wrote in 2001 that white culture "ruthlessly excludes African American cultural modes as relevant and meaningful," highlighting the insistence in schools of standard English over Black Vernacular English as an example.

In their 2003 study, sociologist Karolyn Tyson and economist William Darity, Jr. said that school staff and faculty who hold racist attitudes about the ability of black students use the acting white disparagement as a cover for disparities in student performance. Shelby Steele wrote in The Content of Our Character that what he identified as middle-class black values are falsely viewed by the majority of blacks as "white," while they are colorblind. He argued that this attitude is distinct from other issues of young blacks in poverty.

Clarence Page made the comparison to crab mentality on The News Hour with Jim Lehrer in 2004:

Kenji Yoshino, a New York University School of Law professor, in his Covering: The Hidden Assault on Our Civil Rights (2006), criticizes social pressures to conform to mainstream white culture. He said this violated African Americans' civil rights, and they can uphold their own social distinctions. He said they should be able to freely choose to identify with white culture if they wish. In 2008, political observer John McWhorter has commented, "[t]eenagers have a variety of identities open to them for trying on Anti-establishment postures. White kids can be stoners or goths. Black kids can be 'nonwhite'." He interpreted those kids as black "nerds," and stated that the acting white attitude developed as the creation of an "Other" among newly integrated African-American kids.

See also

African American Vernacular English
Blackface
Boba liberal
Colonial mentality
Crab mentality
Ethnic option
House Negro
Internalized racism
Miss Ann
Mister Charlie
Oppositional culture
Oreo
Passing (racial identity)
Pinkerton Syndrome
Race traitor
Racial achievement gap in the United States
Shoneen
Stereotype threat
Stereotypes of African Americans
Straight-acting
Tall poppy syndrome
Uncle Tom
Uppity
West Brit
Wigger
Yellow cab (stereotype)

References

Further reading
McWhorter, John. 2019 July 20. "The Origins of the ‘Acting White’ Charge." The Atlantic.
Morin, Richard. 2005 June 5. "The Price of Acting White." The Washington Post.
Ogbu, John U. 2004. "Collective Identity and the Burden of 'Acting White'." The Urban Review 36(1):1–35. .
Pluviose, David. 2006 April 5. "Study: ‘Acting White’ Accusation." Diverse Education.
Solomon, Nancy. 2009 October 31. "Facing Identity Conflicts, Black Students Fall Behind." National Public Radio.

African-American culture
Cultural assimilation
African Americans and education
Race and education in the United States
Education issues
Education policy in the United States
Politics and race in the United States
Social inequality
African-American-related controversies
White American culture
Anti-African and anti-black slurs